El Sol (meaning "the Sun" in English) was a Spanish newspaper published in Madrid, Spain, between 1917 and 1939.

History and profile
El Sol was first published on 1 December 1917 by Nicolás María de Urgoiti. Edited by Manuel Aznar Zubigaray, its writers included Julio Álvarez del Vayo and Ernesto Giménez Caballero. The paper had its headquarters in Madrid.

El Sol ceased publication in early 1939, after the Falange forces of Francisco Franco captured Madrid, and the newspaper's facilities were taken over by the Falange newspaper Arriba.

References

1917 establishments in Spain
1939 disestablishments in Spain
Defunct newspapers published in Spain
Newspapers published in Madrid
Publications established in 1917
Publications disestablished in 1939
Spanish-language newspapers